Santiago Urquiaga Pérez (born 18 April 1958) is a Spanish retired footballer who played as a right back.

Club career
Born in Barakaldo, Biscay, Urquiaga played nine professional seasons with local powerhouse Athletic Bilbao, being an instrumental defensive fixture in the club's back-to-back La Liga conquests (1983–84) and starting in all the 67 games he appeared in during that timeframe. He made his debut in the competition on 13 May 1979, playing 26 minutes in a 0–4 away loss against Atlético Madrid.

Urquiaga's final two seasons were spent with RCD Español, helping the Catalans reach the final of the UEFA Cup in his first year, a penalty shootout loss to Germany's Bayer 04 Leverkusen. He retired in June 1989, at the age of 31.

International career
Urquiaga earned 14 caps for the Spain national team during four years, and was selected to the squad for the 1982 FIFA World Cup and UEFA Euro 1984, being first-choice at the latter tournament as the nation eventually finished runner-up, to hosts France. His first match occurred on 26 March 1980, in a 0–2 friendly defeat to England in Barcelona.

Urquiaga also competed at the 1980 Summer Olympics.

Honours

Club
Athletic Bilbao
La Liga: 1982–83, 1983–84
Copa del Rey: 1983–84
Supercopa de España: 1984

Español
UEFA Cup: Runner-up 1987–88

International
Spain
UEFA European Championship: Runner-up 1984

References

External links
 
 
 
 
 

1958 births
Living people
Spanish footballers
Footballers from Barakaldo
Association football defenders
La Liga players
Segunda División B players
Tercera División players
Bilbao Athletic footballers
Athletic Bilbao footballers
RCD Espanyol footballers
Spain youth international footballers
Spain under-21 international footballers
Spain amateur international footballers
Spain B international footballers
Spain international footballers
1982 FIFA World Cup players
UEFA Euro 1984 players
Olympic footballers of Spain
Footballers at the 1980 Summer Olympics
Basque Country international footballers